The 2012 Roasso Kumamoto season sees Roasso Kumamoto compete in J.League Division 2 for the fifth consecutive season. Roasso Kumamoto are also competing in the 2012 Emperor's Cup.

Players

Competitions

J. League

League table

Matches

Emperor's Cup

References

Roasso Kumamoto
Roasso Kumamoto seasons